Bayron Efrén Piedra Avilés (born August 19, 1982 in Cuenca) is an Ecuadorian middle distance and long-distance runner.

He won the 2007 and 2008 editions of the Guayaquil Marathon. He also competed at the 2004 Olympic Games, the 2005 Summer Universiade, the 2007 World Championships, the 2008 Olympic Games and the 2012 Olympic Games without reaching the final round.

He demonstrated his regional strength with a double gold in the 1500 metres and 5000 metres at the 2009 South American Championships in Athletics. He decided to run in both the 1500 m and 5000 m races at the 2009 World Championships in Athletics but he did not succeed in either event, finishing third last in the heats of the 1500 m and failing to finish at all in the 5000 m

He has medalled at regional competitions a number of times. He took part in the 2003 Pan American Games and reached the 1500 m final, finishing in eighth. In 2004, he came within a second of scoring a long race/short race double at the South American Cross Country Championships, but Juan Suárez of Argentina just finished ahead of him in the short competition. He won a bronze in the long race in 2006. He improved upon his past performance by taking a bronze in the 2007 Pan American Games.

Personal bests
800 metres: 1:46.55 min NR -  Belém, 25 May 2008
1500 metres: 3:37.88 min NR -  Rio de Janeiro, 25 July 2007
3000 metres: 7:47.06 min NR -  Belém, 19 May 2010
5000 metres: 13:23.72 min NR -  Ninove, 21 July 2012
10000 metres: 27:32.59 min NR -  Stanford, 1 May 2011
Half marathon: 1:02:35 hrs -  New York City, 20 March 2016
Marathon: 2:14:12 hrs -  Rio de Janeiro, 21 August 2016

International competitions

MARATHON 
2014 CHICAGO MARATHON 71st

2015 LALA MARATHON 2nd

2016 ROTTERDAM MARATHON DNF
     RIO DE JANEIRO Olympic games marathon 18th

2017 LANE BIWA MARATHON DNF 
     NEW YORK CITY MARATHON DNF
2018 CHICAGO MARATHON 61st

2019 ROTTERDAM MARATHON DNF

2021 Xiamen Marathon & Tuscany Camp 
     Global Elite Race DNF

DNF 5/9

References

External links

1982 births
Athletes (track and field) at the 2003 Pan American Games
Athletes (track and field) at the 2004 Summer Olympics
Athletes (track and field) at the 2007 Pan American Games
Athletes (track and field) at the 2008 Summer Olympics
Athletes (track and field) at the 2011 Pan American Games
Athletes (track and field) at the 2012 Summer Olympics
Ecuadorian male long-distance runners
Ecuadorian male marathon runners
Ecuadorian male middle-distance runners
Living people
Olympic athletes of Ecuador
Pan American Games medalists in athletics (track and field)
People from Cuenca, Ecuador
Athletes (track and field) at the 2015 Pan American Games
Pan American Games silver medalists for Ecuador
Pan American Games bronze medalists for Ecuador
Universiade medalists in athletics (track and field)
World Athletics Championships athletes for Ecuador
Athletes (track and field) at the 2018 South American Games
South American Games gold medalists for Ecuador
South American Games bronze medalists for Ecuador
South American Games medalists in athletics
Universiade medalists for Ecuador
Ecuadorian male cross country runners
South American Championships in Athletics winners
Medalists at the 2009 Summer Universiade
Medalists at the 2007 Pan American Games
Medalists at the 2011 Pan American Games
South American Games gold medalists in athletics